In road-transport terminology, a lane departure warning system (LDWS) is a mechanism designed to warn the driver when the vehicle begins to move out of its lane (unless a turn signal is on in that direction) on freeways and arterial roads. These systems are designed to minimize accidents by addressing the main causes of collisions: driver error, distractions and drowsiness. In 2009 the U.S. National Highway Traffic Safety Administration (NHTSA) began studying whether to mandate lane departure warning systems and frontal collision warning systems on automobiles.

There are four types of systems:
Lane departure warning (LDW): Systems which warn the driver if the vehicle is leaving its lane with visual, audible, and/or vibration warnings
Lane keeping assist (LKA/LKS): Systems which warn the driver and, with no response, automatically take steps to ensure the vehicle stays in its lane
Lane centering assist (LCA): Systems which assist in oversteering, keeping the car centered in the lane, and asking the driver to take over in challenging situations
Automated lane keeping systems (ALKS): Designed to follow lane markings with no human driver.

Another system is the emergency lane keeping (ELK). The emergency lane keeping applies correction to a vehicle which drift beyond a solid lane marking.

Rationale and method

One of the main causes of single vehicle crashes and frontal crashes is lane departure. The goal of the lateral support systems (LSS) is to help to avoid such crashes.

Without those LSS systems, lane departure can be unintentional; the car drifts towards and across the edge of the lane. The car then reach a potentially dangerous situation. This system does not work when the edge of the lane is not marked by a line.

A lane detection system used behind the lane departure warning system uses the principle of Hough transform and Canny edge detector to detect lane lines from realtime camera images fed from the front-end camera of the automobile. A basic flowchart of how a lane detection algorithm works to help lane departure warning is shown in the figures.

Lane warning/keeping systems are based on:
Video sensors in the visual domain (mounted behind the windshield, typically integrated beside the rear mirror)
Laser sensors (mounted on the front of the vehicle)
Infrared sensors (mounted either behind the windshield or under the vehicle)

In Europe, the lane departure warning system should be compatible with a visible lane marking identification standard such as commission regulation EU-351/2012.

History
The concept and a working model of this technology was invented and fitted to a Rover SD1 in England by British inventor Nick Parish in 1988. Patent  application No 8911571.1 was made in 1989.

The first production lane departure warning system in Europe was developed by the United States company Iteris for Mercedes Actros commercial trucks. The system debuted in 2000, and is now available on many new cars, SUVs, and trucks.

In 2002, the Iteris system became available on Freightliner Trucks' North American vehicles. In both these systems, the driver is warned of unintentional lane departures by an audible rumble strip sound generated on the side of the vehicle drifting out of the lane. No warnings are generated if, before crossing the lane, an active turn signal is given by the driver.

2001 
Nissan Motors began offering a lane-keeping support system on the Cima sold in Japan.

2002 
Toyota introduced its lane monitoring system on models such as the Caldina and Alphard sold in Japan; this system warns the driver if it appears the vehicle is beginning to drift out of its lane.

2003 
Honda launched its Lane Keep Assist System (LKAS) on the Inspire. It provides up to 80% of steering torque to keep the car in its lane on the highway. It is also designed to make highway driving less cumbersome, by minimizing the driver's steering input. A camera, mounted at the top of the windshield just above the rear-view mirror, scans the road ahead in a 40-degree radius, picking up the dotted white lines used to divide lane boundaries on the highway. The computer recognizes that the driver is "locked into" a particular lane, monitors how sharp a curve is, and uses factors such as yaw and vehicle speed to calculate the steering input required.

2004 
In 2004, the first passenger-vehicle system available in North America was jointly developed by Iteris and Valeo for Nissan on the Infiniti FX and (in 2005) the M vehicles. In this system, a camera (mounted in the overhead console above the mirror) monitors the lane markings on a roadway. A warning tone is triggered to alert the driver when the vehicle begins to drift over the markings. Also in 2004, Toyota added a lane keeping assist feature to the Crown Majesta which can apply a small counter-steering force to aid in keeping the vehicle in its lane.

2005 
Citroën became the first in Europe to offer LDWS on its 2005 C4 and C5 models, and its C6. This system uses infrared sensors to monitor lane markings on the road surface, and a vibration mechanism in the seat alerts the driver of deviations.

2006 
Lexus introduced a multi-mode lane keeping assist system on the LS 460, which utilizes stereo cameras and more sophisticated object- and pattern-recognition processors. This system can issue an audiovisual warning and also (using the electric power steering or EPS) steer the vehicle to hold its lane. It also applies counter-steering torque to help ensure the driver does not over-correct or "saw" the steering wheel while attempting to return the vehicle to its proper lane. If the radar cruise control system is engaged, the Lane Keep function works to help reduce the driver's steering-input burden by providing steering torque; however, the driver must remain active or the system will deactivate.

2007 
In 2007, Audi began offering its Audi lane assist feature for the first time on the Q7. This system, unlike the Japanese "assist" systems, will not intervene in actual driving; rather, it will vibrate the steering wheel if the vehicle appears to be exiting its lane. The LDW System in Audi is based on a forward-looking video-camera in its visible range, instead of the downward-looking infrared sensors in the Citroën. Also in 2007, Infiniti offered a newer version of its 2004 system, which it called the Lane Departure Prevention (LDP) system. This feature utilizes the vehicle stability control system to help assist the driver maintain lane position by applying gentle brake pressure on the appropriate wheels.

2008 
General Motors introduced Lane Departure Warning on its 2008 model-year Cadillac STS, DTS, and Buick Lucerne models. The General Motors system warns the driver with an audible tone and a warning indicator on the dashboard. BMW also introduced Lane Departure Warning on the 5 Series (E60) and 6 Series, using a vibrating steering wheel to warn the driver of unintended departures. In late 2013 BMW updated the system with Traffic Jam Assistant appearing first on the redesigned BMW X5, this system works below . Volvo introduced the lane departure warning system and the driver alert control on its 2008 model-year S80, the V70, and XC70 executive cars. Volvo's lane departure warning system uses a camera to track road markings and sound an alarm when drivers depart their lane without signaling. The systems used by BMW, Volvo, and General Motors are based on core technology from Mobileye.

2009 
Mercedes-Benz began offering a Lane Keeping Assist function on the new E-class. This system warns the driver (with a steering-wheel vibration) if it appears the vehicle is beginning to leave its lane. Another feature will automatically deactivate and reactivate if it ascertains the driver is intentionally leaving his lane (for instance, aggressively cornering). A newer version will use the braking system to assist in maintaining the vehicle's lane.

2010 
Kia Motors offered the 2011 Cadenza premium sedan with an optional lane departure warning system (LDWS) in limited markets. This system uses a flashing dashboard icon and emits an audible warning when a white lane marking is being crossed, and emits a louder audible warning when a yellow-line marking is crossed. This system is canceled when a turn signal is operating, or by pressing a deactivation switch on the dashboard; it works by using an optical sensor on both sides of the car.

2011 
Audi A7 introduces Audi active lane assist.

2012 
Mobileye developed a system that detected lane markings, and identified when a vehicle departed from its driving lane without the use of the turn signal.

2013 
Mercedes began Distronic Plus with Steering Assist and Stop&Go Pilot on the redesigned S-class in 2013.

2014 
Tesla Model S comes with advanced lane assistance systems with their 2014 release. It was also released with a speed assist feature where the front facing camera reads the traffic speed limits using the technology of computer vision character recognition system, and then conveys it to the car. On roads where traffic signs are absent, it relies on the GPS data. When the car moves away from a lane at above , the system beeps and the steering wheel vibrate, alerting the driver of an unintended lane change. This happens during speed limit non-compliance as well.

Fiat is launching its lane keep assist feature based on TRW's lane keeping assist system (also known as the haptic lane feedback system). This system integrates the lane-detection camera with TRW's electric power-steering system; when an unintended lane departure is detected (the turn signal is not engaged to indicate the driver's desire to change lanes), the electric power-steering system will introduce a gentle torque that will help guide the driver back toward the center of the lane. Introduced on the Lancia Delta in 2008, this system earned the Italian Automotive Technical Association's Best Automotive Innovation of the Year Award for 2008. Peugeot introduced the same system as Citroën in its new 308.

Lane departure warning systems combine prevention with risk reports in the transportation industry. Viewnyx applies video-based technology to assist fleets in lowering their driving liability costs. By providing safety managers with driver- and fleet-risk assessment reports and tools, it facilitates proactive coaching and training to eliminate high-risk behaviors. The Lookout Solution is used by North American fleets, and there is research on implementing a lane departure warning system via a mobile phone.

2017 
An Insurance Institute for Highway Safety raised concern that drivers may be less vigilant when relying on automated safety systems or become distracted by dashboard displays that monitor how the systems are performing.

Two separate studies found that lane-keeping systems and blind spot monitoring systems had lower crash rates than the same vehicles without the systems. Police crash data from 25 states between 2009 and 2015 for vehicle models where the systems were sold as optional reduced rates of single-vehicle, sideswipe, and head-on crashes by 11 percent, and injuries in such crashes by 21 percent. The sample size was not large enough to control for demographic and other variables.

Lane keeping and next technologies 

Lane keeping assist (LKA) is a feature that, in addition to the lane departure warning system, automatically takes steps to ensure the vehicle stays in its lane. Some vehicles combine adaptive cruise control with lane keeping systems to provide additional safety.

While the combination of these features creates a semi-autonomous vehicle, most require the driver to remain in control of the vehicle while it is in use. This is because of the limitations associated with the lane-keeping feature.

The lane keeping assist system is being achieved in modern vehicle systems using image processing techniques called Hough transform and Canny edge detection techniques. These advanced image processing techniques derive lane data from forward facing cameras attached to the front of the vehicle. Real-time image processing using powerful computers like Nvidia's Drive PX1 are being used by many vehicle OEMs to achieve fully autonomous vehicles in which lane detection algorithm plays a key part. Advanced lane detection algorithms are also being developed using deep learning and neural network techniques. Nvidia has achieved high accuracy in developing self-driving features including lane keeping using the neural network based training mechanism in which they use a front facing camera in a car and run it through a route and then uses the steering input and camera images of the road fed into the neural network and make it 'learn'. The neural network then will be able to change the steering angle based on the lane change on the road and keep the car in the middle of the lane.

A lane keeping assist mechanism can either reactively turn a vehicle back into the lane if it starts to leave or proactively keep the vehicle in the center of the lane. Vehicle companies often use the term "lane keep(ing) assist" to refer to both reactive lane keep assist (LKA) and proactive lane centering assist (LCA) but the terms are beginning to be differentiated.

Tesla uses the most advanced lane assist system (kind of LKA) combined with their adaptive cruise control system marketed together as 'Autopilot'.

In 2020, UNECE released an automated lane keeping system (ALKS) regulation which include features such as lane-keeping and adaptative speed for specific roads up to 60 km/h.

Tesla includes features like lane-keeping assist and also automatic lane changing without driver input. A similar technology to lane assist is used to do autopark feature as well.

Vehicles
Requires driver control while vehicle is in use, but adjusts steering if vehicle detects itself drifting out of lane ((LKA) refers to reactive "lane keep(ing) assist" and (LCA) refers to proactive lane centering):

List shows up to 2015 model year. This feature has become more widespread since then, as seen below.

Allows unassisted driving under limited conditions

Prevalence
Lane keeping assist is mandatory for new cars and vans in the European Union as of 2022.

Limitations
Lane departure warning systems and lane keeping systems rely on visible lane markings. They typically cannot decipher faded, missing, or incorrect lane markings. Markings covered in snow or old lane markings left visible can hinder the ability of the system.

UNECE regulation 130 does not require LDWS of heavy vehicles to work under 60 km/h or to work in a curve with a radius lower than 250 meters.

Lane departure warning systems also face many legal limitations regarding autonomous driving. As stated previously, this system requires constant driver input. Vehicles with this technology are limited to assisting the driver, not driving the vehicle. Lane departure warning systems biggest limitation is that it is not in complete control of the vehicle. The system does not take into account other vehicles on the road and "cannot replace good driving habits".

Potential danger
American Automobile Association testers found advanced driver assistance systems inconsistent and dangerous. Systems performed 'mostly as expected', but when approaching a simulated disabled vehicle a collision occurred 66 per cent of the time and the average impact speed was 25 mph (40kmh).

See also
Autonomous car
Adaptive cruise control
Blind spot monitor
Intelligent car
Lane centering

References

External links
 Consumer Reports has an extensive list of current vehicles with different safety systems like lane keep assist

Advanced driver assistance systems
Warning systems